Carlo Giuseppe Bergamini (19 January 1868 – 16 July 1934) was a sculptor and monumental mason born in Carrara, in Italy, who later migrated to New Zealand.  He is known there as the designer of a number of well-regarded war memorials, in New Zealand, relating to the Boer War.

References

 Riverton memorial to the New Zealand dead in the South African War

1870 births
1934 deaths
Italian emigrants to New Zealand
People from Carrara
Monumental masons
20th-century Italian sculptors
20th-century Italian male artists
20th-century New Zealand male artists
Italian male sculptors
20th-century New Zealand sculptors